Darwish Mohammed (Arabic:درويش محمد) (born 8 January 1993) is an Emirati footballer who plays as a left back.

External links

References

Emirati footballers
1993 births
Living people
Dubai CSC players
Al Ahli Club (Dubai) players
Baniyas Club players
Dibba FC players
Khor Fakkan Sports Club players
Hatta Club players
UAE First Division League players
UAE Pro League players
Association football fullbacks
Footballers at the 2014 Asian Games
Asian Games competitors for the United Arab Emirates